Hugo Bruckmann (13 October 1863, in Munich – 3 September 1941, in Munich) was a German publisher.

Bruckmann was the younger son of the publisher Friedrich Bruckmann. After his father's death in 1898 Hugo and his brother Alphons became the owners of F. Bruckmann KAG in Munich. Bruckmann and his wife Elsa Bruckmann were among the early and highly influential promoters of Adolf Hitler, and they helped him with gaining access to, and acceptance within, upper-class circles in Munich.

The Bruckmanns were from 1928 public promoters of the National Socialist Society for German Culture. As from 1930 Hugo Bruckmann was a board member of the "Kampfbund" for German culture, founded by Alfred Rosenberg, and from 1932 until his death in 1941 he was a NSDAP member of the Reichstag. After Oskar von Miller’s resignation in 1933 Bruckmann became a member of the board for the German museums. His personal influence on Hitler were to some extent to reduce the political interference within the cultural sphere. The attempt to ban Jewish books from libraries was successfully opposed by Bruckmann.

After the outbreak of World War II Bruckmann was, because of personal connections, able to have his publishing house declared of special importance for the war effort. After his death in 1941 he was honored with a state funeral.

References

Further reading
Othmar Plöckinger, Geschichte eines Buches: Adolf Hitlers Mein Kampf 1922-1945
Henry Ashby Turner, jr., Hitler's secret pamphlet for industrialists, 1927.

See also
Alfred Schuler

1863 births
1941 deaths
Businesspeople from Munich
People from the Kingdom of Bavaria
Nazi Party politicians
Militant League for German Culture members
Nazi propagandists
German publishers (people)
Members of the Reichstag of the Weimar Republic
Members of the Reichstag of Nazi Germany